Jan Víšek (born June 12, 1981) is a Czech former professional ice hockey player who played for HC Bílí Tygři Liberec in the Czech Extraliga.

Víšek also played for HC Berounští Medvědi, HC Benátky nad Jizerou and HC Jablonec nad Nisou.

References

External links

Czech ice hockey forwards
HC Benátky nad Jizerou players
HC Berounští Medvědi players
HC Bílí Tygři Liberec players
Living people
1981 births
Sportspeople from Liberec
HC Vlci Jablonec nad Nisou players